The 1989 Gael Linn Cup, the most important representative competition for elite level participants in the women's team field sport of camogie, was won by Leinster, who defeated Munster in the final, played at Silver Park Kilmacud.

Arrangements
Leinster won their seventh successive title. Munster defeated Ulster 9–10 to 1–4 in the semi-final at Burren, Co. Down. Leinster fell behind to three quick Munster points at the start of the final. Then Angela Downey (2–4), Breda Holmes (2–1), Ann Downey (0–4) and Clare Jones (1–1), scored most of Leinster's 5–12 against 3–6 for Munster, including two goals from Collette O'Mahony.

Trophy
In the Gael Linn trophy semi-final Leinster defeated Connacht 3–12 to 0–14 at Clane and Ulster defeated Munster 1–12 to 4–2. Sarah Ann Quinn and Mary Donnelly were the stars of Ulster's 1–11 to 2–3 victory over Leinster in the final at Kilmacud.

Final stages

|}

Junior Final

|}

References

External links
 Camogie Association

1989 in camogie
1989
Cam